KYZ may refer to:

Kyzyl Airport, Russia, IATA code
KYZ relay, used for electricity metering